Damir Kajin (born 3 February 1962) is a Croatian politician.

Born in Koper, he grew up in Buzet.

Kajin was the Istrian Democratic Assembly (IDS) candidate in the 2009 Croatian presidential election. He won 3.87% of the vote in the first round and was eliminated.

In 2013, Kajin was expelled from IDS. In 2014, he founded a new party, Istrian Democrats.

References

External links
Croatian Parliament's profile of Damir Kajin  
Saborski enfant terrible 

1962 births
Living people
Politicians from Koper
Representatives in the modern Croatian Parliament
Candidates for President of Croatia
People from Buzet